The Coup d'état of 18 Brumaire brought Napoleon Bonaparte to power as First Consul of France. In the view of most historians, it ended the French Revolution and led to the Coronation of Napoleon as Emperor. This bloodless coup d'état overthrew the Directory, replacing it with the French Consulate. This occurred on 9 November 1799, which was 18 Brumaire, Year VIII under the short-lived French Republican calendar system.

Context

After Habsburg-controlled Austria declared war on France on 12 March 1799, emergency measures were adopted and the pro-war Jacobin faction triumphed in the April election. With Napoleon and the republic's best army engaged in the Egypt and Syria campaign, France suffered a series of reverses on the battlefield in the spring and summer of 1799. The Coup of 30 Prairial VII (18 June) ousted the Jacobins and left Emmanuel Joseph Sieyès, a member of the five-man ruling Directory, the dominant figure in the government. France's military situation improved following the Second Battle of Zurich, fought on 25–26 September. As the prospect of invasion receded, the Jacobins feared a revival of the pro-peace Royalist faction. When Napoleon returned to France on 9 October, both factions hailed him as the country's savior.

Dazzled by Napoleon's campaign in the Middle East, the public received him with an ardor that convinced Sieyès he had found the general indispensable to his planned coup. However, from the moment of his return, Napoleon plotted a coup within the coup, ultimately gaining power for himself rather than Sieyès.

Probably the weightiest possible obstacles to a coup were in the army. Some generals, such as Jean-Baptiste Jourdan, honestly believed in republicanism; others, such as Jean Bernadotte, believed themselves capable of governing France. Napoleon worked on the feelings of all, keeping secret his own intentions.

Before the coup, troops were conveniently deployed around Paris. The plan was, first, to persuade the Directors to resign, then, second, to get the Council of Ancients and the Council of Five Hundred (the upper and lower houses of the legislature) to appoint a pliant commission that would draw up a new constitution to the plotters' specifications.

Events of 18 Brumaire, Year VIII

On the morning of 18 Brumaire, Lucien Bonaparte falsely persuaded the Councils that a Jacobin coup was at hand in Paris, and induced them to depart for the safety of the suburban Château de Saint-Cloud. Napoleon was charged with the safety of the two Councils and given command of all available local troops.

Later that morning, Emmanuel Joseph Sieyès and Roger Ducos resigned as Directors. The now former 1797–1799 2nd Minister of Foreign Affairs Charles Maurice de Talleyrand-Périgord, a close ally of Napoleon, pressured Director Paul Barras to do the same.

The resignation of three of the five Directors on day one of the coup prevented a quorum and thus practically abolished the five-man Directory, but the two Jacobin Directors, Louis-Jérôme Gohier and Jean-François-Auguste Moulin, continued to protest furiously. Both men were arrested on day two by Napoleon's ally General Jean Victor Marie Moreau, and by the following day, they were compelled to give up their resistance.

In contrast to the Directory, the two Councils were not yet intimidated and continued meeting.

Events of 19 Brumaire
By the following day, the deputies had for the most part realized that they were facing an attempted coup rather than being protected from a Jacobin rebellion. Faced with their refusal to submit, Napoleon stormed into the chambers, escorted by a small force of grenadiers. While perhaps unplanned, this proved to be the coup within the coup: from this point, this was a military affair.

Napoleon found the Ancients resistant "despite a massive show of military strength." He was met with heckling as he addressed them with such "home truths" as, "the Republic has no government" and, most likely, "the Revolution is over." One deputy called out, "And the Constitution?" Napoleon replied, referring to earlier parliamentary coups, "The Constitution! You yourselves have destroyed it. You violated it on 18 Fructidor; you violated it on 22 Floreal; you violated it on 30 Prairial. It no longer has the respect of anyone."

Napoleon's reception by the Council of Five Hundred was even more hostile. His grenadiers entered just as the legality of Barras's resignation was being challenged by the Jacobins in the chamber. Upon entering, Napoleon was first jostled, then outright assaulted. By some accounts, he came close to fainting. It was not Napoleon himself, but his brother Lucien, president of the council, who called upon the grenadiers to defend their leader. Napoleon escaped, but only through the use of military force.

A motion was raised in the Council of Five Hundred to declare Napoleon an outlaw. At this point, Lucien Bonaparte apparently slipped out of the chamber and told the soldiers guarding the Councils that the majority of the Five Hundred were being terrorized by a group of deputies brandishing daggers. According to Michael Rapport, "He pointed to Napoleon's bloody, pallid face as proof; although at least one account mentions Napoleon scratching his own face in frustration and rage until he drew blood. Then, in a theatrical gesture, Lucien seized a sword and promised to plunge it through his own brother's heart if he were a traitor." Lucien ordered the troops to expel the violent deputies from the chamber. Grenadiers under the command of General Joachim Murat marched into the Orangerie and dispersed the council. This was effectively the end of the Directory.

The Ancients passed a decree that adjourned the Councils for three months, appointed Napoleon, Sieyès, and Ducos provisional consuls, and named the Corps législatif. Some tractable members of the Five Hundred, rounded up afterwards, served to give these measures the confirmation of their House. Thus the Directory and the Councils came to an end.

Aftermath

Completion of the coup

With the Council routed, the plotters convened two commissions, each consisting of twenty-five deputies from the two Councils. The plotters essentially intimidated the commissions into declaring a provisional government, the first form of the consulate with Napoleon, Sieyès, and Ducos as Consuls. The lack of reaction from the streets proved that the revolution was, indeed, over. "A shabby compound of brute force and imposture, the 18th Brumaire was nevertheless condoned, nay applauded, by the French nation. Weary of revolution, men sought no more than to be wisely and firmly governed." Resistance by Jacobin officeholders in the provinces was quickly crushed. Twenty Jacobin deputies were exiled, and others were arrested. The commissions then drew up the "short and obscure Constitution of the Year VIII", the first of the constitutions since the Revolution without a Declaration of Rights.

Bonaparte thus completed his coup within a coup by the adoption of a constitution under which the First Consul, a position he was sure to hold, had greater power than the other two. In particular, he appointed the Senate and the Senate interpreted the constitution. The Sénat conservateur allowed him to rule by decree, so the more independent Conseil d'État and Tribunat were relegated to unimportant roles.  It led ultimately to the rise of the First French Empire.

Reception by Karl Marx

In 1852, Karl Marx wrote  The Eighteenth Brumaire of Louis Bonaparte about a much later event, the coup d'état of 1851 against the
Second Republic by Napoleon III, who was Napoleon's nephew.  Marx considered Louis Napoleon a trifling politician compared to his world-conquering uncle, as expressed in Marx's oft-quoted opening bon mot: "Hegel remarks somewhere that all great world-historic facts and personages appear, so to speak, twice. He forgot to add: the first time as tragedy, the second time as farce."

References

Further reading
 
 
 Lefebvre, Georges. The French Revolution Volume II: from 1793 to 1799 (1964) pp 252–56

External links
 

Military coups in France
1799 events of the French Revolution
French Republican calendar
1799 in France
Conflicts in 1799
18th-century coups d'état and coup attempts
French Consulate